Ruth Gordon Jones (October 30, 1896 – August 28, 1985) was an American actress, screenwriter, and playwright. She began her career performing on Broadway at age 19. Known for her nasal voice and distinctive personality, Gordon gained international recognition and critical acclaim for film roles that continued into her 70s and 80s. Her later work included performances in Rosemary's Baby (1968), What Ever Happened to Aunt Alice? (1969), Where's Poppa? (1970), Harold and Maude (1971), Every Which Way But Loose (1978), Any Which Way You Can (1980), and My Bodyguard (1980).

In addition to her acting career, Gordon wrote numerous plays, film scripts, and books, most notably co-writing the screenplay for the 1949 film Adam's Rib. Gordon won an Academy Award, a Primetime Emmy, and two Golden Globe Awards for her acting, as well as three Academy Award nominations for her writing.

Early life and education

Ruth Gordon Jones was born in Quincy, Massachusetts, at 41 Winthrop Avenue. She later resided at 41 Marion Street (1901–1903) and 14 Elmwood Avenue (1903–1914). All three homes are in the Wollaston section of town.

She was the child of Annie Tapley (née Ziegler) and Clinton Jones. Her only sibling was an older half-sister Claire, from her father's first marriage. She was baptized an Episcopalian. Her first appearance in the public eye came as an infant when her photograph was used in advertising for her father's employer, Mellin's Food for Infants and Invalids. Prior to graduating from Quincy High School, she wrote to several of her favorite actresses requesting autographed pictures. A personal reply from Hazel Dawn (whom she had seen in a stage production of The Pink Lady) inspired her to go into acting. Although her father was skeptical of her chances of success in a difficult profession, in 1914, he took his daughter to New York, where he enrolled her in the American Academy of Dramatic Arts.

Career

Silent films 

In 1915, Gordon appeared as an extra in silent films that were shot in Fort Lee, New Jersey, including as a dancer in The Whirl of Life, a film based on the lives of Vernon and Irene Castle. That same year, she made her Broadway debut in a revival of Peter Pan, or the Boy Who Wouldn't Grow Up, in the role of Nibs (one of the Lost Boys), appearing onstage with Maude Adams and earning a favorable mention from powerful critic Alexander Woollcott. He described her favorably as "ever so gay", and became her friend and mentor.

In 1918, Gordon played opposite actor Gregory Kelly in the Broadway adaptation of Booth Tarkington's Seventeen. The pair continued to perform together in North American tours of Frank Craven's The First Year and Tarkington's Clarence and Tweedles. Then in 1921, Gordon and Kelly were wed.

In December 1920, Gordon checked into a Chicago hospital to have her legs broken and straightened to treat her lifelong bow-leggedness. After a three-month recovery,  Kelly and she relocated to Indianapolis, where they started a repertory company.

Kelly died of heart disease in 1927, at the age of 36. Gordon at the time had been enjoying a comeback, appearing on Broadway as Bobby in Maxwell Anderson's Saturday's Children, performing in a serious role after being typecast for years as a "beautiful, but dumb" character.

In 1929, Gordon was starring in the hit play Serena Blandish when she became pregnant by the show's producer, Jed Harris. Their son, Jones Harris, was born in Paris that year and Gordon brought him back to New York. Although they never married, Gordon and Harris provided their son with a normal upbringing and his parentage became public knowledge as social conventions changed. In 1932, the family was living discreetly in a small, elegant New York City brownstone.

1930s 
Gordon continued to act on the stage throughout the 1930s, including notable runs as Mattie in Ethan Frome, Margery Pinchwife in William Wycherley's Restoration comedy The Country Wife at London's Old Vic and on Broadway, and Nora Helmer in Henrik Ibsen's A Doll's House at Central City, Colorado, and on Broadway.

1940s 
Gordon was signed to a Metro-Goldwyn-Mayer film contract for a brief period in the early 1930s, but did not make a movie for the company until her supporting role in Greta Garbo's final film, Two-Faced Woman (1941). Gordon had better luck at other studios in Hollywood, appearing in supporting roles in a string of films, including Abe Lincoln in Illinois (as Mary Todd Lincoln), Dr. Ehrlich's Magic Bullet (as Mrs. Ehrlich) and Action in the North Atlantic, in the early 1940s. Gordon's Broadway acting appearances in the 1940s included Iris in Paul Vincent Carroll's The Strings, My Lord, Are False, Natasha in Katharine Cornell and Guthrie McClintic's revival of Anton Chekhov's Three Sisters, and leading roles in her own plays, Over Twenty-One and The Leading Lady.

Gordon married her second husband, writer Garson Kanin, in 1942. Gordon and Kanin collaborated on the screenplays for the Katharine Hepburn – Spencer Tracy films Adam's Rib (1949) and Pat and Mike (1952). Both films were directed by George Cukor. They were close friends of Hepburn and Tracy, and incorporated elements of the actors' real personalities in the films. Gordon and Kanin received Academy Award nominations for both of those screenplays, as well as for that of a prior film, A Double Life (1947), which was also directed by Cukor.

1950s 
The Actress (1953) was Gordon's film adaptation of her own autobiographical play, Years Ago, filmed by MGM with Jean Simmons portraying the girl from Quincy, Massachusetts, who convinced her sea captain father to let her go to New York to become an actress. Gordon would go on to write three volumes of memoirs in the 1970s: My Side, Myself Among Others, and An Open Book.

Gordon continued her stage-acting career in the 1950s, and was nominated for a 1956 Tony, for Best Performance by a Leading Actress in a Play, for her portrayal of Dolly Levi in Thornton Wilder's The Matchmaker, a role she also played in London, Edinburgh, and Berlin.

1960s 
In 1966, Gordon was nominated for an Academy Award and won a Golden Globe Award for Best Supporting Actress for Inside Daisy Clover opposite Natalie Wood. It was her first nomination for acting. Three years later, in 1969, she won an Academy Award for Best Supporting Actress for Rosemary's Baby, a film adaptation of Ira Levin's bestselling horror novel about a satanic cult residing in an Upper West Side apartment building in Manhattan. In accepting the award onstage, Gordon thanked the academy by saying, "I can't tell you how encouraging a thing like this is ..." (rousing laughter from the audience). At the time she had been in the business for 50 years and was 72 years old. "And thank all of you who voted for me, and to everyone who didn't: please, excuse me", she added, prompting more laughter and applause.

Gordon won another Golden Globe for Rosemary's Baby, and was nominated again, in 1971, for her role as Maude in Harold and Maude (with Bud Cort as her love interest).

Later career 
She went on to appear in 22 more films and at least that many television appearances through her 70s and 80s, including successful sitcoms such as Rhoda (as the mother of the unseen doorman Carlton, which earned her an Emmy nomination) and Newhart. She portrayed a murderous author on the 1977 episode Columbo: Try and Catch Me. She made countless talk-show appearances, in addition to hosting Saturday Night Live in 1977.

Gordon won an Emmy Award for a guest appearance on the sitcom Taxi, for a 1979 episode called "Sugar Mama", in which her character tries to solicit the services of a taxi driver, played by series star Judd Hirsch, as a male escort.

Her last Broadway appearance was as Mrs. Warren in George Bernard Shaw's Mrs. Warren's Profession, produced by Joseph Papp at the Vivian Beaumont Theater in 1976. In the summer of 1976, Gordon starred in the leading role of her own play, Ho! Ho! Ho! at the Cape Playhouse in Dennis, Massachusetts. She had a minor role as Ma Boggs, the mother of Orville Boggs (Geoffrey Lewis), in the Clint Eastwood films Every Which Way but Loose and Any Which Way You Can.

In 1983, Gordon was awarded the Women in Film Crystal Award for outstanding women who, through their endurance and the excellence of their work, have helped to expand the role of women within the entertainment industry.

Harold and Maude, Adam's Rib, and Rosemary's Baby have been selected for preservation in the National Film Registry of the United States Library of Congress.

Death and legacy
On August 28, 1985, Gordon died at her summer home in Edgartown, Massachusetts, following a stroke at age 88. Her husband for 43 years, Garson Kanin, was at her side and said that even her last day of life was typically full, with walks, talks, errands, and a morning of work on a new play. She had made her last public appearance two weeks before, at a benefit showing of the film Harold and Maude, and had recently finished acting in four films.

In August 1979, a small movie theater in Westboro, Massachusetts, was named the Ruth Gordon Flick. She attended the opening ceremony, standing on a bench in the lobby so she could be seen. The theater no longer exists. In November 1984, the outdoor amphitheater in Merrymount Park in Quincy, Massachusetts, was named Ruth Gordon Amphitheater in her honor.

Acting credits

Film

Television

Theatre

Writing credits

Awards and nominations

See also
 List of actors with Academy Award nominations

References

External links

 
 

1896 births
1985 deaths
20th-century American actresses
20th-century American dramatists and playwrights
20th-century American screenwriters
20th-century American women writers
Actresses from Massachusetts
American Academy of Dramatic Arts alumni
American film actresses
American stage actresses
American television actresses
American women dramatists and playwrights
American women screenwriters
Best Supporting Actress Academy Award winners
Best Supporting Actress Golden Globe (film) winners
Metro-Goldwyn-Mayer contract players
Outstanding Performance by a Lead Actress in a Comedy Series Primetime Emmy Award winners
Screenwriters from Massachusetts
Writers from Quincy, Massachusetts
Kanin family
20th-century American Episcopalians